West Park School is a mixed secondary school located in the Spondon area of Derby in the English county of Derbyshire.

Previously a foundation school administered by Derby City Council, West Park School was converted to academy status on 1 April 2011. However the school continues to coordinate with Derby City Council for admissions. West Park School offers GCSEs and BTECs as programmes of study for pupils.

Notable former pupils and staff

Spondon School
Helen Clark, Labour Party MP for Peterborough

West Park School
Jamaal Lascelles, a professional footballer who plays for Newcastle United.
Ben Osborn, a professional footballer who plays for Sheffield United.

References

External links
West Park School official website
2003 arson link

Secondary schools in Derby
Academies in Derby